Elba is an unincorporated community in North Fork Township, Gallatin County, Illinois, United States.

References

Unincorporated communities in Gallatin County, Illinois
Unincorporated communities in Illinois